The 2003 Algerian Cup Final was the 39th final of the Algerian Cup. The final took place on June 12, 2003, at Stade Mustapha Tchaker in Blida with kick-off at 15:00. USM Alger beat CR Belouizdad in extra time with a golden goal in the 117th minute in the final after the game ended 1–1. It was USM Alger's sixth Algerian Cup in its history.

Algerian Ligue Professionnelle 1 clubs USM Alger and CR Belouizdad were the contestants in the final, in the 41st edition of the Algiers Derby. The competition winners were awarded a berth in the 2004 CAF Confederation Cup.

Route to the final

Pre-match

Details

References

Cup
Algeria
Algerian Cup Finals
USM Alger matches